Below is list of historically documented heads of the Czech statehood in its various iterations, including rulers of Great Moravia in the period since 830 AD.

Monarchs

Pre-Czech period

Legendary rulers of Bohemia (c. 644 - 870)

Princes of Great Moravia (830-906)

Dukes of Bohemia (c. 870–1198)

Kings of Bohemia (1085–1092, 1158–1172, 1198–1918)

Presidents of Czechoslovakia (1918–1992)

Presidents of the Czech Republic (1993–present)

 Parties

See also
List of rulers of Bohemia
List of presidents of Czechoslovakia
List of prime ministers of Czechoslovakia
List of prime ministers of the Czech Socialist Republic
List of rulers of the Protectorate Bohemia and Moravia
List of prime ministers of the Czech Republic
Lists of incumbents

References

External links
The Czech constitution. Articles 54-66 are particularly relevant to the presidency.
The official site of Prague Castle

Czech Republic
Main
Presidents